Swiss Tennis is the governing body of tennis in Switzerland.

It is headquartered at the national tennis center in Biel/Bienne.

External links

Tennis in Switzerland